Culture, Alienation, Boredom and Despair is a 2012 documentary film about Welsh alternative rock band Manic Street Preachers's 1992 debut studio album, Generation Terrorists. It is co-directed by Kieran Evans and Robin Turner.

References

External links 
 Huffington Post article on the documentary
 NME article on the documentary
 Clash article on the documentary
 Uncut article on the documentary

2012 films
Manic Street Preachers
Rockumentaries
2012 documentary films